Christopher Finlay Fraser (October 16, 1839 – August 24, 1894) was an Ontario lawyer and political figure. He represented Grenville South in the Legislative Assembly of Ontario from 1872 to 1879 and Brockville from 1879 to 1894.

He was born in Brockville in Upper Canada in 1839. He worked as an apprentice at the Brockville Recorder while younger, articled in law, was called to the bar in 1864 and set up practice in Brockville. He was elected to the city council and also served as a lieutenant in the local militia. He was a member of the board of directors for the Ontario Bank and helped reorganize the finances of the Brockville and Ottawa Railway. He was a founding member of the Ontario Catholic League in 1869. He was named provincial secretary in 1873 and promoted to commissioner of Public Works the following year. In 1876, he was named Queen's Counsel. Fraser administered the rebuilding of the provincial parliament buildings at Queen's Park completed in 1894. During his time in office, Fraser served as a representative for Roman Catholic voters in the government of Oliver Mowat, defending their interests when he could and soothing their resentment when he couldn't.

He died in Toronto in 1894 after suffering a heart attack.

External links 
Biography at the Dictionary of Canadian Biography Online

1839 births
1894 deaths
Ontario Liberal Party MPPs
Provincial Secretaries of Ontario
People from Brockville
Canadian King's Counsel